The 2009–10 Slovak Cup was the 41st season of Slovakia's annual knock-out cup competition and the seventeenth since the independence of Slovakia. It began on 5 August 2009 with Round 1 and ended on 11 May 2010 with the Final. The winners of the competition earned a place in the third qualifying round of the UEFA Europa League. Košice were the defending champions.

First round
The games were played on 5 August 2009.

|}

Second round
The games were played on 22/23 September 2009.

|}

Third round
The games were played on 20/21 October 2009.

|}

Quarter-finals
The first legs were played on 3/4 November 2009. The second legs were played on 24/25 November 2009.

|}

Semi-finals
The first legs will be played on 6 April 2010. The second legs will be played on 20 April 2010.

|}

Final

External links
 profutbal.sk

References

 

2009–10
Slov
Cup